A skysail is the uppermost sail in many old square-rigged sail-plans (though sometimes topped by a moonsail). It was also on the royal mast above the royal sail. It was typically used in light winds.

References

Sailing rigs and rigging